Henry George Flanagan (22 January 1861 – 23 October 1919) was a South African-born plant collector, traveller, botanist and farmer.  He developed a renowned garden for native South African trees and rare exotic plants. A rare endemic of Eastern Cape, Greyia flanaganii is one of several plants named in his honour.

Biography 
Flanagan was born on 22 January 1861 in Komga, Eastern Cape, South Africa. He was the son of Irish immigrant George Millin Flanagan and Ann Pitt. He was the sixth of nine children and the oldest son. He went to public school in Komga, Eastern Cape. He owned and farmed on Prospect Farm in the Komga District.

Work life
Apart from citrus farming, Flanagan was a botanist. Early February 1889 he started collecting plants and carefully selected and preserved his specimens. He donated specimens to herbaria and other institutions, such as the Albany Museum, South Africa in Grahamstown, Eastern Cape, the South African Government’s botanist in Cape Town and the Royal Botanic Gardens, Kew.  Both the museum's director Selmar Schonland and the South African Government botanist Peter MacOwan recognised Flanagan's work. Schonland said: “he is  a collector who excellently prepared specimens and embraced a number of type-specimens and rare plants which was not previously represented in our collection" MacOwan added his specimens to the South African Government Herbarium. Both Schonland and MacOwan  were well respected botanists, recognized world wide. Harry Bolus, a botanist, helped him with the specimens to England. Bolus with Flanagan’s wife Florence accompanied him on trips. They travel and did research at the Great Kei River,  Bethulie,  Heilbron, Molteno, Aliwal North, Pondoland, Burgersdorp, Port St. Johns, Kimberley, Northern Cape, Lesotho, Robben Island,  Rhodesia and Mont-Aux-Sources. He was also the writer of numerous books on plants.

Organisations
Flanagan was elected a Fellow of the Linnean Society in 1898. In 1902 he became a lifelong member of the Southern Africa Association for the Advancement of Science.

Family life
He married Florence Sarah Reynolds on 9 December 1890 in st Paul's Church in Komga. Florence was the daughter of Charles Francis Reynolds and Janet Natal Walker 1890. They had no children. He died in King William's Town on 23 October 1919.

Plants named in his honour 
The Greyia flanaganii, a spring flowering, South African shrub with bright red, bell shaped petals, is named after Flanagan. It was named the tree of the year in South Africa in 1998.

Other plants were:
 Bryopsis flanaganii
 Cassipourea flanaganii
 Cyrtanthus flanaganii
 Erica flanaganii
 Euphorbia flanaganii
 Gladiolus flanaganii
 Impatiens flanaganiae
 Protea flanaganii
 Raphionacme flanaganii
 Scolopia flanaganii
 Selago flanaganii
 Zaluzianskya flanaganii
Impatiens flanaganiae was named after his wife Florence discovered it at Port St. Johns.

Legacy
The plants in his garden were donated out of his will to the South African Government. They were moved to the Union Buildings and planting area is called the Flanagan Arboretum.

Notes and references

External links 

 
 Global Plants on Jstor
 Transcribed Marriage Entries for FLANAGAN

1861 births
1919 deaths
20th-century South African botanists
Fellows of the Linnean Society of London
19th-century South African botanists